Bani Khanik (also Romanized as Banī Khānīk; also known as Bani Khūng) is a village in Ayask Rural District, in the Central District of Sarayan County, South Khorasan Province, Iran. At the 2006 census, its population was 118, in 43 families.

References 

Populated places in Sarayan County